Brasiliorchis is a genus of orchid (family Orchidaceae). The genus includes species formerly placed in Maxillaria. It is found in South America (Colombia to Ecuador, eastern and southern Brazil to north-east Argentina).

Species
The following species were accepted by the World Checklist of Selected Plant Families, :

 Brasiliorchis barbosae (Loefgr.) R.B.Singer, S.Koehler & Carnevali
 Brasiliorchis chrysantha (Barb.Rodr.) R.B.Singer, S.Koehler & Carnevali
 Brasiliorchis gracilis (Lodd., G.Lodd. & W.Lodd.) R.B.Singer, S.Koehler & Carnevali
 Brasiliorchis heismanniana (Barb.Rodr.) R.B.Singer, S.Koehler & Carnevali
 Brasiliorchis kautskyi (Pabst) R.B.Singer, S.Koehler & Carnevali
 Brasiliorchis marginata (Lindl.) R.B.Singer, S.Koehler & Carnevali
 Brasiliorchis monantha (Barb.Rodr.) Campacci
 Brasiliorchis moutinhoi (Pabst) F.Barros & L.R.S.Guim.
 Brasiliorchis phoenicanthera (Barb.Rodr.) R.B.Singer, S.Koehler & Carnevali
 Brasiliorchis picta (Hook.) R.B.Singer, S.Koehler & Carnevali
 Brasiliorchis piresiana (Hoehne) Christenson
 Brasiliorchis polyantha (Barb.Rodr.) R.B.Singer, S.Koehler & Carnevali
 Brasiliorchis porphyrostele (Rchb.f.) R.B.Singer, S.Koehler & Carnevali
 Brasiliorchis schunkeana (Campacci & Kautsky) R.B.Singer, S.Koehler & Carnevali
 Brasiliorchis ubatubana (Hoehne) R.B.Singer, S.Koehler & Carnevali

References

External links 

 
Maxillariinae genera